Genlisea africana is a species of carnivorous plant in the genus Genlisea. It is native to Zimbabwe. The species was first described by the botanist Daniel Oliver in 1865.

References 
Tropicos.org. Missouri Botanical Garden. 28 Mar 2012 <http://www.tropicos.org/Name/18300170>
Oliver, Daniel. Journal of the Linnean Society, Botany 9: 145. 1865. (J. Linn. Soc., Bot.)

africana
Flora of Zimbabwe
Plants described in 1865
Taxa named by Daniel Oliver